Maurice Gustave Duruflé (11 January 1902 – 16 June 1986) was a French composer, organist, musicologist, and teacher.

Life and career
Duruflé was born in Louviers, Eure in 1902. He became a chorister at the Rouen Cathedral Choir School from 1912 to 1918, where he studied piano and organ with Jules Haelling, a pupil of Alexandre Guilmant. The choral plainsong tradition at Rouen became a strong and lasting influence. At age 17, upon moving to Paris, he took private organ lessons with Charles Tournemire, whom he assisted at Basilique Ste-Clotilde, Paris until 1927. In 1920 Duruflé entered the Conservatoire de Paris, eventually graduating with first prizes in organ with Eugène Gigout (1922), harmony with Jean Gallon (1924), fugue with Georges Caussade (1924), piano accompaniment with César Abel Estyle (1926) and composition with Paul Dukas (1928).

In 1927, Louis Vierne nominated him as his assistant at Notre-Dame. Duruflé and Vierne remained lifelong friends, and Duruflé was at Vierne's side acting as assistant when Vierne died at the console of the Notre-Dame organ on 2 June 1937, even though Duruflé had become titular organist of St-Étienne-du-Mont in Paris in 1929, a position he held for the rest of his life. In 1930 he won a prize for his Prélude, adagio et choral varié sur le "Veni Creator", and in 1936 he won the Prix Blumenthal. In 1939, he premiered Francis Poulenc's Organ Concerto (the Concerto for Organ, Strings and Timpani in G minor); he had advised Poulenc on the registrations of the organ part. In 1943 he became Professor of Harmony at the Conservatoire de Paris, where he worked until 1970; among his pupils were the revered organists Pierre Cochereau, Jean Guillou and Marie-Claire Alain.

In 1947 he completed probably the most famous of his few pieces: the Requiem op. 9, for soloists, choir, organ, and orchestra. He had begun composing the work in 1941, following a commission from the Vichy regime. Also in 1947, Marie-Madeleine Chevalier became his assistant at St-Étienne-du-Mont. They married on 15 September 1953. (Duruflé's first marriage to Lucette Bousquet, in 1932, ended in civil divorce in 1947 and was declared null by the Vatican on 23 June 1953.) The couple became a famous and popular organ duo, going on tour together several times throughout the sixties and early seventies.

He was made a Chevalier de la Legion d'honneur in 1954. He was promoted to an Officier de la Legion d'honneur in 1966.

Perfectionism
Duruflé was highly critical of his own compositions. He particularly disparaged the third and final movement 'Toccata' from his Suite, op. 5, and never recorded it. He never programmed the Toccata, his Sicilienne or the Prelude or Adagio from Veni Creator.

He published only a handful of works and often continued to edit and change pieces after publication. For instance, the Toccata from Suite has a completely different ending in the first edition than in the more recent version, and the score to the Fugue sur le nom d'Alain originally indicated accelerando throughout. The result of this perfectionism is that his music, especially his organ music, tends to be well polished, and is still frequently performed in concerts by organists around the world.

Duruflé and his wife were musically conservative. In 1969 they attended a "jazz mass" at St-Étienne-du-Mont. Marie-Madeleine was visibly upset by the experience, and Duruflé called it a scandalous travesty.

Later life and death
Duruflé suffered severe injuries in a car accident on 29 May 1975, and as a result he gave up performing; indeed he was largely confined to his apartment, leaving the service at St-Étienne-du-Mont to his wife Marie-Madeleine (who was also injured in the accident). He died in a clinic at Louveciennes (near Paris) in 1986, aged 84, never having fully recovered from the accident.

Compositions

Organ solo
 Scherzo op. 2 (1926)
 Prélude, adagio et choral varié sur le theme du 'Veni Creator''' op. 4 (1926/1930)
 Suite op. 5 (1932):
 Prélude
 Sicilienne
 Toccata
 Prélude et fugue sur le nom d'Alain op. 7 (1942)
 Prélude sur l'introït de l'epiphanie op. 13 (1961)
 Fugue sur le thème du  de la Cathédrale de Soissons op. 12 (1962)
 Méditation op. posth. (1964)
 Lecture à vue (unpublished)
 Fugue (unpublished)
 Lux aeterna (unpublished)

Chamber music
 Prélude, récitatif et variations op. 3 for flute, viola, and piano (1928)

Piano solo
 Triptyque op. 1: Fantaisie sur des thèmes grégoriens (1927/1943, unpublished)
 Trois danses op. 6 (1932, piano version by the composer):
 Divertissement
 Danse lente
 Tambourin

Piano for 4 hands
 Trois danses op. 6 (1932, transcribed by the composer):
 Divertissement
 Danse lente
 Tambourin

Two pianos
 Trois danses op. 6 (1932, transcribed by the composer):
 Divertissement
 Danse lente
 Tambourin

Orchestral works
 Trois danses op. 6 (1932):
 Divertissement
 Danse lente
 Tambourin
 Andante et scherzo op. 8 (1940)

Choral works
 Requiem Op. 9:
 For vocal soloists, choir and (large) orchestra (normally including organ, but can be performed without one): commissioned as a symphonic poem in 1941; completed in September 1947; first performed on 2 November 1947; published in 1950
 For the same vocal forces and organ ("organ reduction" version; cello ad libitum in one movement): published in 1948
 For the same vocal forces, organ and (reduced) orchestra (several instruments ad libitum, but one or more string instruments in every movement): published in 1961
 For the same vocal forces and piano (unpublished)
 Quatre Motets sur des thèmes grégoriens op. 10 for choir a cappella (1960):
 Ubi caritas et amor
 Tota pulchra es
 Tu es Petrus
 Tantum ergo
 Messe "Cum jubilo" op. 11 for baritone solo, male choir, and orchestra (1966):
 Version with organ (1967)
 Version with orchestra (1970)
 Version with small orchestra (1972)
 Notre Père op. 14 for unison male choir and organ (1977)
 Version for 4-part mixed choir a capella (1978)

Miscellaneous works
 Chant Donné: Hommage à Jean Gallon (1953)
 Sicilienne from Suite op. 5 for small orchestra (flute, oboe, clarinet, bassoon, horn, and string quintet, unpublished)

Transcriptions
 Johann Sebastian Bach
 Two chorales from cantatas BWV 22 and 147, arranged for organ solo, 1952
 4 chorales preludes for organ, orchestrated 1942-45:
 Nun komm' der Heiden Heiland (Great Eighteen Chorale Preludes)
 Nun freut euch, lieben Christen gmein, BWV 734
 O Lamm Gottes unschuldig, BWV 656 (Great Eighteen Chorale Preludes)
 In dir ist Freude, BWV 615 (Orgelbüchlein)
 Louis Vierne
 Soirs étrangers, op. 56, for violoncello and piano, orchestrated 1943:
 Grenade Sur le Léman Venise Steppe Canadien Poisson chinois Ballade du désespéré, op. 61, lyrical poem for tenor solo and piano, orchestrated 1943
 Three improvisations for organ (Notre-Dame-de-Paris, November 1928), transcribed 1954:
 Marche épiscopale Méditation Cortège Maurice Duruflé: Requiem, op. 9, for voices and piano (1947)
 Charles Tournemire
 Five improvisations for organ (Ste Clotilde, Paris, 1930/1931), transcribed 1956–58:
 Petite rapsodie improvisée Cantilène improvisée Improvisation sur le Te Deum Fantaisie-Improvisation sur l'Ave maris stella Choral-Improvisation sur le Victimae paschali Gabriel Fauré: Prelude of Pelléas et Mélisande, transcribed for organ solo
 Robert Schumann: Lamentation, transcribed for organ solo

References

Sources
 Darasse, Xavier. "Maurice Duruflé", in Guide de la musique d'orgue, edited by Gilles Cantagrel. Paris: Fayard, 1991: 335–337.
 James E. Frazier, Maurice Duruflé: The Man & His Music (The Boydell Press 2007)
 Ronald Ebrecht, ed. Maurice Duruflé (1902–1986): The Last Impressionist. Lanham, MD: Scarecrow Press, 2002. .
 Jörg Abbing. Maurice Duruflé. Aspekte zu Leben und Werk. Verlag Peter Ewers, 2002. .
 Frédéric Blanc. Maurice Duruflé. Souvenirs et autres écrits''. Éditions Atlantica-Séguier, 2005. .

External links

 Association de Maurice et Marie-Madeleine Duruflé
 Maurice Duruflé at Requiem Survey
 Pseudo-poseidonios.net
 Musimem.com

1902 births
1986 deaths
People from Louviers
20th-century classical composers
Composers for pipe organ
French classical composers
French male classical composers
French classical organists
French male organists
French Roman Catholics
Organ improvisers
Conservatoire de Paris alumni
Academic staff of the Conservatoire de Paris
Prix Blumenthal
20th-century French composers
20th-century French male musicians
Male classical organists